Revenge is the "comeback" album from the band Iron Fire, released March 31, 2006. The album followed a struggle to get a record deal and maintain a stable line-up.

Track listing
 "Wings of Rage" - 4:24  
 "Iron Head" - 4:25
 "Metal Messiah" - 4:54
 "Whirlwind of Doom" - 4:51  
 "Savage Prophecy" - 5:28
 "Fate of Fire" - 4:26
 "Stand as King" - 4:49
 "Brotherhood of the Brave" - 4:40  
 "Alone in the Dark" - 4:26
 "Mindmachine" - 3:55
 "Ice-cold Arion" - 4:20 
 "Break the Spell" - 4:40

All songs written by: Martin Steene

Album line-up
Martin Steene -  Vocals (Acoustic Guitar on "Icecold Arion")
Kirk Backarach - Guitars
J.J. - Guitars
Martin Lund - Bass
Jens B. - Drums

Guest Musicians
Tommy Hansen - Keyboards on all tracks except track # 11
Casper Jensen - Keyboards on track # 11

References

2006 albums
Iron Fire albums
Napalm Records albums